De Corpo e Alma (Of Body and Soul in English) is a Brazilian telenovela produced and broadcast by Rede Globo. It premiered on 3 August 1992, replacing Pedra sobre Pedra and ended on 5 March 1993, with a total of 185 episodes. It's the forty sixth "novela das oito" to be aired on the timeslot. It is created by Glória Perez and directed by Roberto Talma.

Cast

References

External links 
 

1992 telenovelas
Brazilian telenovelas
TV Globo telenovelas
1992 Brazilian television series debuts
1993 Brazilian television series endings
Telenovelas by Glória Perez
Portuguese-language telenovelas
Television shows set in Rio de Janeiro (city)
Organ transplantation in fiction